Rear Admiral Sir (Charles) Philip Clarke KBE CB DSO (14 March 1898 – 13 November 1966) was a Royal Navy officer who became Flag Officer, Malta.

Naval career
Clarke joined the Royal Navy in 1911 and was promoted to midshipman in 1914 at the start of the First World War. He served in the Second World War becoming commanding officer of the cruiser HMS Caledon in July 1939 and commanding officer of the cruiser HMS Glasgow in November 1943.

Clarke became Director of Mobilisation at the Admiralty in March 1946 and Flag Officer, Malta in June 1948. In retirement he served as President of the Institution of Electronic and Radio Engineers from 1955 to 1956.

References

1898 births
1966 deaths
Royal Navy rear admirals
Knights Commander of the Order of the British Empire
Companions of the Order of the Bath
Companions of the Distinguished Service Order
Place of birth missing
Place of death missing